Freemasons historically celebrate two feasts of saints who are both named John. The feast of John the Baptist falls on 24 June, and that of John the Evangelist on 27 December, roughly marking mid-summer and mid-winter. During the Eighteenth Century, the Premier Grand Lodge of England and the Grand Lodge of Ireland favoured the day of John the Baptist, while the Grand Lodge of Scotland, the Ancient Grand Lodge of England and the Grand Lodge of All England at York installed their Grand Masters on the feast day of John the Evangelist. The United Grand Lodge of England was formed on 27 December 1813.

John the Baptist

The first Grand Lodge was formed on 24 June the feast day of John the Baptist in 1717. This may arise from a very old tradition, since the Baptist appears to have been regarded as the patron of stonemasons in continental Europe during the Middle Ages. The guild of masons and carpenters attached to Cologne Cathedral was known as the Fraternity of St. John the Baptist. The earliest surviving record of Grand Lodge of Ireland installing a Grand Master is dated to 24 June 1725. As records of individual lodges appear in Ireland and in the Antients' in England, it seems many of them met to install a new master twice a year, on the feast days of both the Baptist and the Evangelist.

John the Evangelist

The Evangelist is particularly associated with Scottish lodges. The Lodge of Edinburgh was associated with the aisle of St. John the Evangelist in St. Giles Cathedral from the 15th century. The Grand Lodge of All England, and its predecessor, the Ancient Society of Freemasons in the City of York, elected and installed their president, then from 1725 their Grand Master on the day of the Evangelist, and in London the Antient Grand Lodge of England elected their new Grand Masters on the same day. When the Antients and the Moderns (the Premier Grand Lodge) eventually came together in the United Grand Lodge of England, it was on the Feast of the Evangelist in 1813..

References

Freemasonry
Saint John's Day